Kevin McGarrity (born 3 August 1973) is a Northern Irish racing driver from Belfast.

McGarrity won the Formula Ford Festival in 1995 after finishing second in the British Formula Ford series. He was nominated for the McLaren Autosport BRDC Award but it went to fellow Northern Ireland driver Jonny Kane. In 1996 he drove in Formula Opel and the following year he drove in the British Formula Three Championship where he finished 10th. In 1998 he moved up to Formula 3000 where he competed in the first five races for Raceprep Motorsport and rounds 7 through 9 for Nordic Racing. He competed full-time in 1999 for Nordic Racing and finished 10th in points despite only finishing in the points once, finishing on the podium in second in the season opener at Imola. He returned to the team and series in 2000, this time with teammate Justin Wilson. He finished 20th in points with a best finish of 4th at Monaco. In 2001 he left formula cars for sports car racing and drove in the 2001 24 Hours of Le Mans for the MG factory team, but the car failed to finish. He drove the same car in 2002 but the result was the same. He returned to the race in 2004 driving a Bioethanol powered Reynard-Judd for Team Nasamax, finishing the race 17th overall. He drove part-time in the Le Mans Series in 2006. He then joined McLaren Automotive as full-time test driver for the new McLaren car project the MP4-12C from the start of the project.

24 Hours of Le Mans results

Complete International Formula 3000 results
(key) (Races in bold indicate pole position) (Races in italics indicate fastest lap)

References

1973 births
Racing drivers from Northern Ireland
Sportspeople from Belfast
International Formula 3000 drivers
24 Hours of Le Mans drivers
British Formula Three Championship drivers
Formula Ford drivers
European Le Mans Series drivers
Living people
ASCAR drivers

Nordic Racing drivers
TOM'S drivers